Cherniavsky (Ukrainian: , Russian: , Yiddish:  is a Slavic surname derived from Polish Czerniawski. Notable people with the surname include:

People
 Aleh Charnyawski (born 1970) Belarusian athlete
 Daniel Cherniavsky (born 1933), Argentinian writer and television producer
 Joseph Cherniavsky (c. 1890–1959), American composer and bandleader
 Olga Chernyavskaya (born 1963), Russian Olympic athlete
 Sally Fox (photographer) (1929-2006), American photographer and editor
 Vlada Chernyavskaya (born 1966), Belarusian badminton player

Other uses
 , a Ukrainian musical group mainly popular from 1901 to 1917
 , a noble family of the Polish-Lithuanian Commonwealth and Russian Empire
 , a village in Novosibirsk Oblast, Russia

See also
 
 Cherniavskyi
 Aleksei Viktorovich Chernavskii (born 1938), Russian mathematician
 Yury Chernavsky (born 1947), Russian producer, composer, and songwriter
 Cherney
 Czerniawski

Ukrainian-language surnames
Jewish surnames